The Brooks River (in French: rivière Brooks) is a tributary of the Nicolet River which flows on the south shore of the St. Lawrence River. The Brooks River flows in the municipalities of Chesterville and Saint-Christophe-d'Arthabaska, in the Arthabaska Regional County Municipality (MRC), in the region of Centre-du-Québec, in Quebec, in Canada.

Geography 

The neighboring hydrographic slopes of the Brooks River are:
 north side: Bulstrode River;
 east side: Gobeil stream, Bulstrode River;
 south side: Dumont River, Nicolet River;
 west side: Nicolet River, Roux stream.

  southwesterly, to the limit of the municipality of Saint-Christophe-d'Arthabaska;
  west, to the north shore of a small lake (lengthː ; altitudeː ) that the current crosses to the south;
  southward, up to the limit of the municipality of Chesterville;
  towards the south, until the confluence of a stream (coming from the east);
  southward, to the route du eighth rang (rang Desharnais);
  southward, to the route du ninth rang (rang Roberge);
  south, to its mouth.

Toponymy 

The term "Brooks" refers to a family surname of English origin. This toponym refers to four members of the Brooks family who obtained grants on more than 600 acres of land on December 10, 1823, in the ranges of Craig South Road and North Craig Road.

The toponym "Brooks River" was formalized on August 17, 1978, at the Commission de toponymie du Québec.

See also 

 List of rivers of Quebec

References 

Arthabaska Regional County Municipality
Rivers of Centre-du-Québec